Reynold Alleyne Higgins (born 26 November 1916 in Weybridge, Surrey; died 18 April 1993 in Dunsfold, Surrey) was a Classical Archaeologist. He worked at the department of Greek and Roman Antiquities at the British Museum from 1947  to 1977, finishing his career as Acting Keeper. He was also Chairman of the Managing Committee of the British School at Athens from 1975 to 1979. He was elected a Fellow of the British Academy in 1972.

He was educated at Sherborne School and Pembroke College, Cambridge.

Books 

Greek and Roman Jewellery. London, Methuen 1961; Second edition 1980, 
Greek terracotta figures. London, British Museum 1969, 
The Greek Bronze Age. London, British Museum 1970, 
The Archaeology of Minoan Crete. London, The Bodley Head 1973, 
Jewellery from classical lands . London, British Museum 1976, 
The Aegina treasure: an archaeological mystery. London, British Museum 1979, 
Tanagra and the figurines. London, Trefoil books 1986, 

Minoan and Mycenaean Art.  New rev. ed., London, Thames & Hudson 1997, 
With Michael Higgins
A Geological Companion to Greece and the Aegean.  London, Duckworth/ Cornell Univ Press 1996,

References

External links 

 Nicolas Coldstream: Obituary: Reynold Alleyne Higgins - 1916-1993 1995 Proceedings of the British Academy, 87: 309-324
 Sinclair Hood: Obituary: Reynold Higgins in  The Independent, 22. April 1993
 Bücher und Schriften in der Datenbank der Uni Freiburg

Fellows of the Society of Antiquaries of London
1916 births
1993 deaths
People educated at Sherborne School
Alumni of Pembroke College, Cambridge
English archaeologists
People from Weybridge
20th-century archaeologists
Employees of the British Museum
Fellows of the British Academy